Epcor Tower is an office tower in downtown Edmonton, Alberta, Canada. The tower is capped by two spires that are capped with four flagpoles each. When the spires were taken into account, it was the tallest building in Edmonton from 2011 to 2017. Epcor Tower is the first building in the Station Lands project. Tenants includes EPCOR Utilities, Capital Power, Ernst & Young, Intuit, and BioWare.

History
Development of the tower started in May 2007 when EPCOR Utilities began seeking proposals from developers to lease  of office space for their 1,100 employees in downtown Edmonton.

It was announced on December 7, 2007, that the company had chosen Qualico to provide the space with the construction of new office tower on the Station Lands site by the CN Tower. Epcor entered into a 20-year lease to become the anchor tenant of the tower with an option for a 15-year renewal. The structure was certified to a silver standard or higher under the Leadership in Energy and Environmental Design (LEED) program. LEED certification is a widely used standard for reducing energy, water and other resources in buildings. With the completion of the building, Edmonton saw its first new office tower in 17 years. Due to the nature of the anchor tenant, the building has been nicknamed the "Power Tower".

Construction of the tower began in spring 2008 and was completed in 2011.

In April 2008, Edmonton City Council approved $45 million in funding to immediately build a 180-metre underground portion of the future Metro LRT line beneath the tower's underground parkade, at the same time as the building's construction. The coordinated construction effort saved the City of Edmonton approximately $140 million. The remaining construction of the Metro Line resumed in 2012, with the line opening in September 2015.

Also in April 2008, Qualico announced plans to bid on the right to host a new Canadian national portrait gallery in the new building. However, the federal government scrapped the plan later in the year.

Gallery

See also 
 List of tallest buildings in Edmonton

References

External links 
 

Skyscrapers in Edmonton
Headquarters in Canada
Skyscraper office buildings in Canada
Towers in Alberta
Office buildings completed in 2011
Retail buildings in Canada